The 1973–74 Israel State Cup (Gvia HaMedina) was the 35th season of Israel's nationwide football cup competition and the 20th after the Israeli Declaration of Independence.

The competition was won by Hapoel Haifa, who have beaten Hapoel Petah Tikva 1–0 at the final.

Results

Third round

Fourth round

Fifth round

|}

Round of 16

|}

Quarter-finals

|}

Semi-finals

|}

Final

References
100 Years of Football 1906-2006, Elisha Shohat (Israel), 2006, pp. 232-233
Cup (Pages 2-5) Hadshot HaSport, 16.9.1973, archive.football.co.il 
Leumit's "shooting range" settled in 125 goals Davar, 16.9.1973, Historical Jewish Press 
Cup (Pages 2-6) Hadshot HaSport, 23.9.1973, archive.football.co.il 
Cup (Pages 3-6) Hadshot HaSport, 30.9.1973, archive.football.co.il 
Beitar Tel Aviv - Hapoel Netanya 6:1 (5:0) (Page 3) Hadshot HaSport, 3.10.1973, archive.football.co.il 
Cup (Pages 2-4) Hadshot HaSport, 4.10.1973, archive.football.co.il 
Maccabi Ramat Amidar - Hapoel Nahliel 1:1 (0:0) (Page 2) Hadshot HaSport, 5.10.1973, archive.football.co.il 

Israel State Cup
State Cup
Israel State Cup seasons